The 1977 Nice International Championships, was a men's tennis tournament played on outdoor clay courts at the Nice Lawn Tennis Club in Nice, France, and was part of the 1977 Colgate-Palmolive Grand Prix. It was the sixth edition of the tournament and was held from 28 March until 3 April 1977. First-seeded Björn Borg won the title.

Finals

Singles
 Björn Borg defeated  Guillermo Vilas 6–4, 1–6, 6–2, 6–0 
 It was Borg' 2nd singles title of the year and the 21st of his career.

Doubles
 Ion Țiriac /  Guillermo Vilas defeated  Chris Kachel /  Chris Lewis 6–4, 6–1

References

External links
 ITF tournament edition details

Nice International Championships
1977
Nice International Championships
Nice International Championships
Nice International Championships
20th century in Nice